Covelong Beach is actually Kovalam beach that is located on the coast of the Bay of Bengal near a village named Covelong, Chennai, India. The British, unable to pronounce the name "Kovalam", conveniently named it Covelong. This is a fishing village 40 km from Chennai. Kovalam Beach is on the way to Mahabalipuram near the East Coast Road (popularly ECR).

Kovalam Beach is one of the finest and beautiful beaches by nature. As it is near Chennai and is located on the way to Mahabalipuram, it is visited by thousands of people each day. Mostly the local crowd is higher in the beach.

Fishing is the main occupation of the people here. Though the beach is famous, it is littered by tourists and the local people alike.

Along with the beach, the village of Covelong, famous for its fishing activities draws many tourists. It is India's first surfing village. There are surfing schools here.

References

Beaches of Tamil Nadu